Ornipholidotos katangae is a butterfly in the family Lycaenidae. It is found in the Democratic Republic of the Congo, Uganda, Kenya, Tanzania and Zambia. The habitat consists of forests.

Subspecies
 Ornipholidotos katangae katangae (Democratic Republic of the Congo, north-western Zambia)
 Ornipholidotos katangae reducta Libert, 2005 (northern and north-eastern Democratic Republic of the Congo, Uganda, western Kenya, north-western Tanzania)

References

Butterflies described in 1947
Ornipholidotos